Grand Prix and other major automobile races in France.

Grand Prix d'Albi or Grand Prix de l'Albigeois
Grand Prix de la Baule
Grand Prix de Bordeaux
Grand Prix de Cadours
Grand Prix de Caen
Grand Prix du Comminges
Grand Prix de Dieppe
Grand Prix de France
Grand Prix de la Marne
Grand Prix de Marseille
Grand Prix de Nice
Pau Grand Prix
Grand Prix de Picardie
Grand Prix de Rouen
24 Hours of Le Mans

 
France